A Woman Scorned is a 1915 American silent short drama film written and directed by William Desmond Taylor. The film stars Robyn Adair, Bessie Banks, Nan Christy, Beatrice Van, and Harry Van Meter.

One of four films with this title made between 1911 and 1915.

Cast
Robyn Adair
Bessie Banks
Nan Christy
Beatrice Van
Harry Van Meter (aka Harry von Meter)

References

External links

1915 films
1915 drama films
Silent American drama films
American silent short films
American black-and-white films
1915 short films
Films directed by William Desmond Taylor
1910s American films
1910s English-language films
American drama short films